Teemu Tamminen (born 27 August 1987) is a Finnish handball player who plays for Riihimäen Cocks and the Finnish national team.

References

1987 births
Living people
People from Riihimäki
Finnish male handball players
Sportspeople from Kanta-Häme